Gang Rags: Reborn is the 5th studio album, and 9th overall album by Blaze Ya Dead Homie, his first release on Majik Ninja Entertainment, and the first release overall by the newly formed label. The album was recorded at "The Dojo", the label's recording studio.

Background
In 2008 it was announced in the song "Kept Grindin'" by DJ Clay featuring Insane Clown Posse, Twiztid, Blaze Ya Dead Homie, Anybody Killa, Axe Murder Boyz & Boondox, Blaze announced that his new album would be called Last House On Dead Street and would be released in 2009. Blaze and Jamie Madrox went to work and began creating the album. The idea was then pushed to the side, and would be released as a tour CD titled Gang Rags: Extended Version (Uncut & Uncensored). In December 2009 on Psychopathic's "Weekly Freekly Weekly" it was announced that Blaze's new album would be titled Gang Rags and it would be produced by Violent J and Mike E. Clark and it would be Blaze's first album without the work of Twiztid in any way. Psychopathic wanted to see how this would work for Blaze, and the album charted at 52 on the Billboard 200, but started to cause waves among the artists. After Twiztid's departure from Psychopathic on December 12, 2012, Blaze was soon to follow. In late 2013/early 2014 Blaze acquired the rights to Gang Rags: Extended Version (Uncut & Uncensored) from Psychopathic Records. In the "New Release Packet" released by INgrooves it explains how the album came about, it says "Blaze and Jamie Madrox contacted Michael 'Seven' Summers and The Dead Beatz to strip away existing beats and recreate the album. Now almost four years later the album sounds the way it should have in 2010". The album features Jamie Madrox & The R.O.C.

Production
Blaze Ya Dead Homie, Jamie Madrox, Michael "Seven" Summers and The Dead Beatz are producers of the album.

Release
The album was scheduled to be released on October 21, 2014. On Twiztid's online store "Twiztid-Shop" they have 3 different pre order packages. The first one you get "Gang Rags: Reborn", a poster, a draw string bag, and an exclusive single of "Rulez 2 Tha Game" ft. Anybody Killa. The second is the album, draw string bag, and the exclusive CD. The third is the album and exclusive CD. In June/July 2014 Blaze released a snippet of "Fuck Shit Up" on his official instagram account. A few weeks later it was announced that Blaze has already recorded a music video for the song "Napalm" and it will be released before the album to help promote it. The video was released on October 5. Twiztid released a promo flyer a week before the release stating, that if you bought "Gang Rags: Reborn" in the first week (October 20–27), you could claim a copy of the original tour exclusive "Gang Rags: Extended Version (Uncut & Uncensored)" album that was released during the Drive-By 2011 Tour.

Singles
The first single from the album, was a 15-second snippet of the song "Fuck Shit Up". The second single is "Napalm" and will be accompanied by a music video. It is also the first music video for the album, and on Twiztid's new label. Blaze also released a snippet for the song "Ghost Bars".

Music videos
On October 5, 2014 the first music video "Napalm" was released. The music video was directed by Ryan Archibald. On January 14, 2015 the second music video "Ghost Bars" was released.

Track listing

Personnel
Blaze Ya Dead Homie - Vocals, Lyrics
Ashley Heidrich - Vocals, Lyrics - (1, 9, 11)
The R.O.C. - Vocals, Lyrics - (4, 15)
Jamie Madrox - Vocals, Lyrics - (7, 12, 14, 15)
Seven - Producer, Engineer - (1, 2, 3, 4, 5, 6, 7, 8, 9, 10, 11, 14)
The Dead Beatz - Producer, Engineer - (12, 13, 15)

Charts

References

2014 albums
Blaze Ya Dead Homie albums
Majik Ninja Entertainment albums
Albums produced by Seven (record producer)